Silverhorn may refer to:
 The Silverhorn, a route to the summit of Mount Athabasca
 the former name (1973-90) of Silver Mountain, ski resort in Kellogg, Idaho.
 Silverhorn: The Hilda Conkling Book for Other Children, a collection of poetry published in 1924.
 Silverhorn Ramsey, a character from the 1944 novel Canal Town by Samuel Hopkins Adams.
 Silver Horn, a character from the Mega Man X video game series
 Silver Horn, alias for Kiowa artist Haungooah (Silverhorn)
 Silverhorn, a kind of caddisfly mimicked as a fishing lure
 Silverhorn Mountain, in Banff National Park